Turkey competed at the 2017 World Games held in Wroclaw, Poland.

Medalists

Karate 

Uğur Aktaş won the bronze medal in the men's kumite 84 kg event.

Serap Özçelik won the bronze medal in the women's kumite 50 kg event.

Muay Thai 

Ali Dogan won the gold medal in the men's 81 kg event.

Meltem Baş won the bronze medal in the women's 54 kg event.

References 

Nations at the 2017 World Games
2017 in Turkish sport
2017